This article provides details of international football games played by the Algeria national football team from 2020 to present.

Results

2020

2021

2022

Forthcoming fixtures
The following matches are scheduled:

Head to head records

References

Algeria national football team results
2020s in Algerian sport